Bis(pinacolato)diboron is a covalent compound containing two boron atoms and two pinacolato ligands. It has the formula [(CH3)4C2O2B]2; the pinacol groups are sometimes abbreviated as "pin", so the structure is sometimes represented as B2pin2. It is a colourless solid that is soluble in organic solvents.  It is a commercially available reagent for making pinacol boronic esters for organic synthesis. Unlike some other diboron compounds, B2pin2 is not moisture-sensitive and can be handled in air.

Preparation and structure
This compound may be prepared by treating tetrakis(dimethylamino)diboron with pinacol in acidic conditions. The B-B bond length is 1.711(6) Å.

Dehydrogenation of pinacolborane provides an alternative route:
2(CH3)4C2O2BH → (CH3)4C2O2B-BO2C2(CH3)4 + H2

Reactions

The B-B bond adds across alkenes and alkynes to give the 1,2-diborylated alkanes and alkenes. Using various organorhodium or organoiridium catalysts, it can also be installed onto saturated hydrocarbons:
CH3(CH2)6CH3 + [pinB]2 → pinBH + CH3(CH2)7Bpin
These reactions proceed via boryl complexes.
Bis(pinacolato)diboron can also be used as reducing agent for example in transition metal catalyzed hydrogenations of alkenes and alkynes.

References

Organoboron compounds
Reagents for organic chemistry